The Sam Roi Yot leaf-toed gecko (Dixonius kaweesaki) is a species of lizard in the family Gekkonidae. The species is endemic to Thailand.

Etymology
The specific name, kaweesaki, is in honor of Thai naturalist Kaweesak Keeratikiat.

Geographic range
D. kaweesaki is found in Prachuap Khiri Khan Province, Thailand.

Habitat

Reproduction
The mode of reproduction of D. kaweesaki is unknown.

Gallery

References

Further reading
Sumontra M, Chomngan N, Phanamphon E, Pawangkhanant P, Viriyapanon C, Thanaprayotsak W, Pauwels OSG (2017). "A new limestone-dwelling leaf-toed gecko (Gekkonidae: Dixonius) from Khao Sam Roi Yot massif, peninsular Thailand". Zootaxa 4247 (5): 556–568. (Dixonius kaweesaki, new species).

Dixonius
Reptiles described in 2017